Eric Resetar (1928 – 21 December 2011) was a New Zealand cartoonist, best known for his superhero comics Crash Carson of the future and Crash O'Kane, an All Black on Mars.

Early life 
Resetar was born in Auckland, New Zealand, in 1928. He was influenced by science fiction magazines and comics such as Buck Rogers from a young age.

Career 
Resetar's first comics were published during World War II, while he was still at school. His early comics were popular, with some issues selling 10,000 copies. The New Zealand comics awards, the Erics, were named after him. From the 1960s, he ran a series of secondhand bookshops in Auckland, specialising in science fiction paperbacks.

Exhibitions 
 'Cartoon Show' (2001–2002), Auckland Art Gallery

Publications 
 Treasure comic : Black Cobra and the red gold (194?). Auckland, Triple C Co
 Adventure: thrills on the planet Jupiter! (1944) Auckland, Artcraft
 Crash Carson of the future (1943). Auckland, Triple C Co.
 Halfback (1960). Auckland, self published

References

1928 births
2011 deaths
New Zealand cartoonists
New Zealand comics artists